Daviesia angulata is a species of flowering plant in the family Fabaceae and is endemic to the south-west of Western Australia. It is an erect, spreading shrub with prickly, flattened phyllodes, and yellow flowers with red markings.

Description

Taxonomy and naming
Daviesia angulata was first formally described in 1839 by John Lindley in the A Sketch of the Vegetation of the Swan River Colony from an unpublished description by George Bentham. The specific epithet (angulata) means "angular", referring to the branchlets.

Distribution and habitat
This species of pea mainly grows in jarrah forest and mallee-heath between Eneabba, Busselton, Wongan Hills and Mount Barker.

Conservation status
Daviesia angulata is classified as "not threatened" by the Government of Western Australia Department of Biodiversity, Conservation and Attractions.

References

angulata
Eudicots of Western Australia
Plants described in 1839
Taxa named by John Lindley